Robert "Robbie" Robinson Belmar (born December 17, 1998) is an American professional soccer player who plays for Major League Soccer club Inter Miami.

Club career

Charleston Battery
Robinson signed with United Soccer League side Charleston Battery on an academy contract ahead of their 2017 season. He made his professional debut on June 14, 2017, as an 88th minute substitute during a 3–2 loss to Atlanta United FC in the 2017 U.S. Open Cup.

Clemson Tigers
Robinson played college soccer at Clemson from 2017 to 2019. He scored his first collegiate goal on September 22, 2017, against Pittsburgh.

On January 4, 2020, Robinson won the Hermann Trophy, an award for the top college soccer player in the United States. On May 20, 2020, Robinson was named the ACC Male Athlete of the Year, an award for the top male player across all sports in the Atlantic Coast Conference. In the award's 67 year history, Robinson was the first male soccer player to win the award.

Inter Miami CF
In December 2019, he was announced as having signed with Major League Soccer as a Generation Adidas player, and would be available in the 2020 MLS SuperDraft.
Robinson was selected 1st overall in the 2020 MLS SuperDraft by Inter Miami.

He made his MLS debut for Inter Miami against Los Angeles FC on March 1, 2020.

International career
Robinson is eligible to play for Chile and for the United States, since he was born in the United States to an American father and a Chilean mother.

On August 23, 2021, he was called up to the Chile national team. Days later, he arrived at Santiago before three matches for the 2022 FIFA World Cup qualification. On September 1, the day before the first match against Brazil, he received the nationalization documents and his Chilean passport. However, on the same day, Robinson returned to Miami citing he needed more time to decide which team to represent.

Career statistics

Club

Honors 
Individual
Hermann Trophy: 2019
ACC Athlete of the Year: 2020

References

External links
Clemson Tigers bio

1998 births
Living people
All-American men's college soccer players
American soccer players
American people of Chilean descent
Sportspeople of Chilean descent
Association football forwards
Charleston Battery players
Clemson Tigers men's soccer players
Inter Miami CF draft picks
Inter Miami CF players
People from Camden, South Carolina
Soccer players from South Carolina
Major League Soccer first-overall draft picks
Major League Soccer players